From the 15th century onwards, the Great Council of the Netherlands at Mechelen (Dutch: De Grote Raad der Nederlanden te Mechelen; French: le grand conseil des Pays-Bas à Malines; German: der Grosse Rat der Niederlände zu Mecheln) was the highest court in the Burgundian Netherlands. It was responsible for the Dutch-, French- and German-speaking areas. In Luxembourgish the phrase "mir ginn op Mechelen" (we'll go to Mechelen) still means playing one's last trump card. The Grote Raad first sat in the Schepenhuis in Mechelen then, from 1616, in the (old) palace of Margaretha of Austria on Keizerstraat.

Origins and history

The medieval rulers were assisted by advisers. Together with the ruler they formed the Council of State, also called the consilium or curia. Gradually the council became more specialised, with separate financial, judicial and political council emerging.

In the Burgundian Netherlands, the councils initially travelled with the Duke. In 1473 Duke Charles the Bold decided to establish the council in a specific location, in Mechelen. The council took on the name of the Parliament of Mechelen. After Charles' death in 1477, this parliament was abolished by Charles' daughter Mary of Burgundy on the occasion of the issuing of the Great Privilege. This was the result of the constant struggle between the centralisation of the rulers and the particularism of the states. The French king was also against a parliament in Mechelen, as it would become a rival of the Parliament of Paris. Nonetheless, under Philip the Fair, the Great Council was again established in Mechelen in 1504, this time permanently, but without the addition of parliament to its name.

In the 16th century the territorial powers of the Great council grew. Through the establishment of authority by Charles V, Holy Roman Emperor over Tournai, Utrecht, Friesland, Overijssel and Guelders, the council's territory now included all of the Seventeen Provinces.

In 1526 the construction of a new Seat for the Great Council started by the architect and Master Mason Rombout II Keldermans. This Brabantine Gothic project was abandoned in 1547 —with little more than the ground floor built. The council was losing power and influence. After the Eighty Years' War, the Dutch Republic became independent. In the Northern Netherlands, the judicial power was taken over by the provincial council and the Supreme court of Holland, Zeeland and West-Friesland (1582). The Great Council of Mechelen remained active in the remaining Southern Netherlands, of which France annexed the southern province of Artois and parts of Flanders, Hainaut and Luxembourg. A number of provincial councils declared themselves independent from the Great Council: in the beginning of the 16th century the councils of Brabant and Hainaut did this, and in the late 18th century (1782) the judicial councils of Luxembourg and Tournai as well. This left the Great Council only Flanders, Mechelen, Namur and Upper Guelders.

The Great Council was abolished during the French Revolution. During the first French invasion in 1792, the Council moved to Roermond, where it watched over the last unoccupied lands, the twelve remaining municipalities of Austrian Guelders. During the second French invasion in 1794, part of the council members moved to Regensburg and Augsburg, in imperial territory; another part chose for the new regime and became part of the new judicial organisation.

Composition

The composition of the Great Council was noticeably stable throughout the centuries. It had one chairman or president, 15 to 16 councillors, one procureur-general, one replacement procureur-general, one fiscal advocate, 10 paid secretaries, two or three clerks, advocates and lastly Huissier de justice. Of the councillors, who wore red vestments, traditionally four were clerical, later lessened to two. All councillors were appointed by the ruler from a list of candidates of the Council itself. They had to be licentiate or doctor in law at one of the universities in the ruler's lands.

The following people were council members:

Presidents 

The president was appointed for life by the monarch. Normally noble lords were chosen, they had the right to change their coats of arms with heraldic maces.

The President was the direct contact between the Council and the Emperor, he had great influence and played often a major part in local history or even beyond. Many Presidents had a great international network that allowed them to enlarge their social status.

Others 

Impressive buildings built by the councillors include:
Hof van Busleyden
Hof van Palermo
Hof van Prant

Role
The competence of the Great Council strongly fluctuated from period to period and from province to province. In the small lordship of Mechelen, it controlled practically all legislative and executive power. It was also the court, for both initial charges and appeals for persons and institutions that fell under royal protection. Members of the court, knights of the Order of the Golden Fleece, and everyone who was privileged through title or function could only be judged before the Great Council. For the rest the Council functioned as a court of appeal and a court of cassation over all sentences made by provincial justice councils and other, lower, courts in the Seventeen Provinces (or what remained of it later on). The Great Council also treated issues of privileges, mandates, letters of commendation, letters of marque, donations of functions and goods, gifts and other taxes, confiscation of property, jurisdiction conflicts between separate government institutions, and also border conflicts.
Appeals against judicial rulings were also handled, but generally only against serious cases. On the other hand, family rights and inheritance usually fell under the jurisdiction of the church courts.

Archives of the Great Council of Mechelen can be found in the National and Provincial State Archives in Brussels and the Archives Départementales du Nord in Lille. Because it held jurisdiction over large areas and widely ranging subjects during its three centuries of existence, the Great Council takes an important place in the Legal history of the Netherlands and Belgium.

Records
A calendar of the memorials of the Great Council edited by Arthur Gaillard has been published in two volumes under the title Inventaire des mémoriaux du Grand Conseil de Malines (Brussels, P. Weissenbruch, 1900–1903).

See also 
 Council of Troubles
 Privy Council of the Habsburg Netherlands
 supreme council in Vienna

References 

Legal history of the Netherlands
Legal history of Belgium
Early Modern Luxembourg
Councils
History of Mechelen
Buildings and structures in Mechelen
1470s in the Burgundian Netherlands
Habsburg Netherlands
Defunct courts
1794 disestablishments in the Habsburg monarchy
1794 disestablishments in the Holy Roman Empire
Disestablishments in the Austrian Netherlands
Courts and councils in the Burgundian and Habsburg Netherlands
Courts and tribunals established in 1473
Courts and tribunals disestablished in 1794